Liza, the Fox-Fairy is a 2015 Hungarian black comedy film directed by Károly Ujj Mészáros, starring Mónika Balsai, Szabolcs Bede-Fazekas and David Sakurai. The film drew an audience of over 100,000 in Hungary.

The film's music was elected as one of 2015's "catchiest soundtracks" in Hungary and four songs were recorded on a limited 7-inch vinyl.

Plot
Liza is a 30-year-old, naïve, lonely nurse living in "Csudapest", the capital of a fictionalized 1970s Hungary with a capitalist system. She has taken care of Márta, the widow of the former Japanese ambassador, for the last 12 years. Taking inspiration from a cheap Japanese romance novel, on her 30th birthday, Liza goes to a Mekk Burger restaurant in hopes of falling in love. While she’s away, Márta is killed by Liza's only friend, Tomy Tani, the ghost of a Japanese pop singer from the 1950s, resulting in Liza inheriting her apartment. Relatives report Liza to the police for murdering Márta. Sergeant Zoltan is put on the case, who gets very nearly killed in the process, and falls slowly in love with Liza after moving into her apartment as a flatmate. She gains confidence, but all her dating efforts end in fatal accidents. Liza is convinced that she has become a fox-fairy, a demon from Japanese mythology. According to the legend, men who fall in love with a fox-fairy die soon afterwards, and the fox-fairy is doomed to be alone forever.

Cast 

 Mónika Balsai as Liza, the Fox-Fairy
 David Sakurai as Tomy Tani
 Szabolcs Bede-Fazekas as Sergeant Zoltán
 Piroska Molnár as Márta, the widow of a Japanese Ambassador to Hungary
 Zoltán Schmied as Henrik
 Antal Cserna as Károly
 Gábor Reviczky as police Colonel
 Mariann Kocsis as Hildácska
 Ági Gubík as Inge
 Lehel Kovács as Mr. Ludvig
 Győző Szabó: Mr B., or Jonny
 János Bán as Heartbreak
 István Hajdu as Ferenc, a manager
 László Nádasi as staff sergeant
 Sándor Szűcs as police doctor
 Nóra Diána Takács as Police Secretary
 Dezső Rancsó as chimney sweeper
 Vali Dániel as Teri
 Zsuzsa Töreky as Edit
 Mária Bókay as Vilma
 István Gőz as Dr. Keserű
 Kata Bartsch as Kriszta
 Klára Jarábik as Orsi
 Rodrigo Crespo as Orsi's husband
 Batjav Batod as Eskimo
 Zoltán Karácsonyi as Teleshop Giovanni
 Katalin Kiss Horváth as Johnny's daughter
 Orsolya Mihály as Mekk Burger's salesgirl
 Andrea Balázs as sick-nurse
 Katalin Ben as Malvinka
 Kata Losonczi as Timi
 Gyöngy Bérces as Cosmo cover girl
 Gábor Harsányi as Narrator (voice)

Production
The film is based on the play Liselotte és a május by Zsolt Pozsgai. The Japanese theme was added by Károly Ujj Mészáros, who was fascinated by Japanese culture, especially pop music from the 1960s and 1970s. He was also attracted by similarities between Japanese and Hungarian traditions. He had directed several commercials in Japan, which gave him further familiarity with Japanese culture. The film was produced by Filmteam with co-production support from Origo Film Group. The budget was 420 million forint (~1.6 million USD), of which 220 million came from the Hungarian National Film Fund. The cast rehearsed for a month before filming started.

Release 
The film was released theatrically in Hungary on 19 February 2015. It was also screened at various film like Fantasporto Film Festival in Portugal) on 2 March 2015 and Seattle International Film Festival (USA) on 25 May 2015.

Awards 
 31st Imagine Film Festival
- Silver Scream Award, Méliès d’Argent for the best European fantastic film
 nominated for Golden Méliès
- The audiences top-3 of the festival
 33rd Brussels International Fantastic Film Festival (BIFFF)
- 7th Orbit Award for Best Film (haven’t already been presented at Brussels and have been produced in the last two years, attributed by a national jury of professionals)
- The Pegasus Award, Prize of the Audience
 Nocturna 2015 - Madrid International Fantastic Film Festival
- "Paul Naschy" Award(Best Film)
- Best Director
- Best Play: Actor (Szabolcs Bede-Fazekas) and Actress (Mónika Balsai)
- Best Screenplay
- Best Special Effects
 Fantaspoa - XI. International Fantastic Film Festival of Porto Alegre
- Best Actress (Mónika Balsai)
41st Seattle International Film Festival
- Grand Jury Prize, New Directors Competition (Károly Ujj Mészáros)
8th CinEmaCity International Film Festival - Serbia and the region
- Cineuropa Prize, which singles out the best international film hailing from the Danube countries
 10th Fantastic Fest - Austin
- Audience award 2nd Place
 21st Lund International Fantastic Film Festival − Lund
- Siren Award  for best international film,
- Audience Award for Best Feature
 4th Monsters of Film - Stockholm
 - Audience Award for Best Feature
 3rd Cellar Door Film Festival - Ottawa
- Audience Award for Best Feature
 15th Hungarian Film Festival of Los Angeles
- Best Film "Hungarians in Hollywood" Award: Károly Ujj Mészáros
- Best Actress Award jury prize: Mónika Balsai
 29th Leeds International Film Festival - Leeds
- Audience Award for New Narrative Feature
 17th European Film Festival in Essonne - Ris-Orangis
- Grand Prix (2015)
 54th Hungarian Film Critics Award - Budapest
- Best First Film of 2015 (Károly Ujj Mészáros)

Adaptation
An Indian adaptation of the film, titled Aafat-E-Ishq, was released on October 29, 2021.

Notes

References

External links 

Cannes 2013 International Village Hungarian pavilion 106 2012 Liza, the Fox-Fairy synopsis p. 1, Hungarian National Film Fund
Catalogue 2015, Liza, the Fox-Fairy synopsis p. 5, Hungarian National Film Fund

2015 romantic comedy-drama films
2015 films
2015 black comedy films
Films based on Japanese myths and legends
Films set in the 1970s
Films set in Hungary
2010s ghost films
2010s Hungarian-language films
2010s fantasy comedy-drama films
Hungarian fantasy films
Hungarian romantic comedy-drama films
2015 comedy films
2010s Japanese films